Crimean Tatar also called Crimean, is a Kipchak Turkic language spoken in Crimea and the Crimean Tatar diasporas of Uzbekistan, Turkey, Romania, and Bulgaria, as well as small communities in the United States and Canada. It should not be confused with Tatar proper, spoken in Tatarstan and adjacent regions in Russia; the languages are related, but belong to two different subgroups of the Kipchak languages and thus are not mutually intelligible. It has been extensively influenced by nearby Oghuz dialects.

A long-term ban on the study of the Crimean Tatar language following the deportation of the Crimean Tatars by the Soviet government has led to the fact that at the moment UNESCO ranked the Crimean Tatar language among the languages under serious threat of extinction (severely endangered).

Number of speakers
Today, more than 260,000 Crimean Tatars live in Crimea. Approximately 150,000 reside in Central Asia (mainly in Uzbekistan), where their ancestors had been deported in 1944 during World War II by the Soviet Union. However, of all these people, mostly the older generations are the only ones still speaking Crimean Tatar. In 2013, the language was estimated to be on the brink of extinction, being taught in only around 15 schools in Crimea. Turkey has provided support to Ukraine, to aid in bringing the schools teaching in Crimean Tatar to a modern state.
An estimated 5 million people of Crimean origin live in Turkey, descendants of those who emigrated in the 19th and early 20th centuries. Of these an estimated  still speak the language. Smaller Crimean Tatar communities are also found in Romania and Bulgaria. Crimean Tatar is one of the seriously endangered languages in Europe.

Almost all Crimean Tatars are bilingual or multilingual, using as their first language the dominant languages of their respective home countries, such as Russian, Turkish, Romanian, Uzbek, Bulgarian or Ukrainian.

Classification and dialects

The Crimean Tatar language consists of three dialects. The standard language is written in the middle dialect (Bağçasaray, orta yolaq), which is part of the otherwise largely extinct Kipchak branch of the Turkic family and is the most commonly spoken dialect. There is also the southern dialect, also known as the coastal dialect (yalıboyu, cenübiy), which is in the Oghuz branch spoken in Turkey and Azerbaijan, and the northern dialect, also known as Nogai dialect (noğay, çöl, şimaliy), which is spoken in Kazakhstan. Speakers of the northern dialect calls his language Tatarşa or Tatar tĭlĭ (Tatar tili) which means Tatar language. 

Crimean Tatar has a unique position among the Turkic languages, because its three "dialects" belong to three different (sub)groups of Turkic. This makes the classification of Crimean Tatar as a whole difficult.

Volga Tatar 
Because of its common name, Crimean Tatar is sometimes mistaken to be a dialect of Tatar proper, or both being two dialects of the same language. However, Tatar spoken in Tatarstan and the Volga-Ural region of Russia belongs to the different Bulgaric subgroup of the Kipchak languages, and its closest relative is Bashkir. Both Volga Tatar and Bashkir differ notably from Crimean Tatar, particularly because of the specific Volga-Ural Turkic vocalism and historical shifts.

History

The formation period of the Crimean Tatar spoken dialects began with the first Turkic invasions of Crimea by Cumans and Pechenegs and ended during the period of the Crimean Khanate. However, the official written languages of the Crimean Khanate were Chagatai and Ottoman Turkish. After Islamization, Crimean Tatars wrote with an Arabic script.

In 1876, the different Turkic Crimean dialects were made into a uniform written language by Ismail Gasprinski. A preference was given to the Oghuz dialect of the Yalıboylus, in order to not break the link between the Crimeans and the Turks of the Ottoman Empire. In 1928, the language was reoriented to the middle dialect spoken by the majority of the people.

In 1928, the alphabet was replaced with the Uniform Turkic Alphabet based on the Latin script. The Uniform Turkic Alphabet was replaced in 1938 by a Cyrillic alphabet. During the 1990s and 2000s, the government of the Autonomous Republic of Crimea under Ukraine encouraged replacing the script with a Latin version again, but the Cyrillic has still been widely used (mainly in published literature, newspapers and education). The current Latin-based Crimean Tatar alphabet is the same as the Turkish alphabet, with two additional characters: Ñ ñ and Q q. Currently, in the Autonomous Republic of Crimea, all official communications and education in Crimean Tatar are conducted exclusively in the Cyrillic alphabet.

Phonology

Vowels

The vowel system of Crimean Tatar is similar to some other Turkic languages.

Consonants

In addition to these phonemes, Crimean also displays marginal phonemes that occur in borrowed words, especially palatalized consonants.

At the same time the southern and some central dialects preserve glottal  which is pronounced  in the standard language.

Grammar 
The grammar of Crimean Tatar, like all Turkic languages, is agglutinating, with the exclusive use of suffixing to express grammatical categories.  Generally, suffixes are attached to the ends of word stems, although derivational morphology makes uses of compounding as well.  Overall, the grammatical structure of the language is similar to that of other West Kipchak varieties.  Crimean Tatar is a pro-drop language with a generally SOV word order.

Morphophonology 
Crimean Tatar, like most Turkic languages, features pervasive vowel harmony, which results in sound changes when suffixes are added to verb or noun stems.  Essentially, the vowel in a suffix undergoes assimilation to agree in certain categories with the vowel in the stem.  The two main types of assimilation that characterize this agreement in Crimean Tatar morphophonology are backness harmony and rounding harmony.

Using the transliteration system in Kavitskaya (2010), non-high vowels undergoing backness harmony vary between [a] and [e], and are represented as A.  High vowels that undergo both backness and rounding harmony alternate between [i], [y], [ɪ] and [u] and are represented as I.  High vowels in suffixes that are never rounded and alternate between [i] and [ɪ] are represented as Y, whereas high vowels in suffixes that are always round and alternate between [u] and [y] are represented as U.

Some consonants undergo similar harmonizing changes depending on whether the preceding segment is voiced or voiceless, or whether the segment demonstrates backness harmony.  Consonants that alternate between [k], [q], [g] and [ɣ] are represented as K, alternating [k] and [g] as G, alternating [t] and [d] by D, and alternating [tʃ] and [dʒ] as Ç.

Thus, the suffix -şAr could be rendered as “şar” or “şer” depending on the vowel in the morpheme preceding it.

Verbs 
Crimean Tatar verbal morphology is fairly complex, inflecting for tense, number, person, aspect, mood and voice.  Verbs are conjugated according to the following paradigm:

{| class="wikitable"
|[STEM] + [reflexive] + [causative] + [passive] + [negation] + [tense/aspect/mood] + [person/number]
|}

It is possible, albeit rare, for a single verb to contain all of these possible components, as in:

For the most part, each type of suffix would only appear once in any given word, although it is possible in some circumstances for causative suffixes to double up.

Infinitive verbs take the -mAK suffix and can be negated by the addition of the suffix -mA between the verb stem and the infinitive suffix, creating verb constructions that do not easily mirror English.

Verb derivation	
	
Novel verb stems are derived chiefly by applying a verbalizing suffix to a noun or adjective, as demonstrated in the following examples: 

Bare verb stems can also be compounded with noun stems to create new verbs, as in:

Person markers

There are two types of person markers for finite verbs, pronominal and possessive.  Depending on tense and mood, verbs will take one or the other set of endings.

{| class="wikitable"
|+ Pronominal
! ||Singular||Plural
|-
!1st Person
| -(I)m
| -mIz
|-
!2nd Person
| -sIñ
| -sI(ñI)z
|-
!3rd Person
| Ø
| -(lAr)
|}
{| class="wikitable"
|+ Possessive
! ||Singular||Plural
|-
!1st Person
| -(I)m
| -mIz
|-
!2nd Person
| -sIñ
| -sI(ñI)z
|-
!3rd Person
| Ø
| -(lAr)
|}

Grammatical person is not marked in third person singular, and the marker is optional in third person plural.  As shown above, these markers come as the last element in the broader verb complex.

Tense and aspect markers	

Grammatical tense and aspect are expressed in combination by the addition of various markers to the verb stem.  Some of these markers match with pronominal person markers, while others take possessive person markers.  Each tense/aspect has an associated negation marker; most of these are -mA but there is some variation.

{| class="wikitable"
|-
! !! Marker !! Negation !! Person Marker !! Example
|-
!General Present
| -A/y || -mAy || pronominal || alam (“I take”)
|-
!Present Progressive
| -mAKtA || -mA || pronominal || yazmaqtamız (“We are writing.”)
|-
!Future/Present
| -Ar/Ir || -mAz || pronominal || bağırırım (“I will yell.”)
|-
!Categorical Future
| -cAK || -mAy || pronominal || alacağım (“I will [probably] take”)
|-
!General Past
| -DY || -mA || possessive || qırımğa keldik (“We returned to Crimea.”)
|-
!Evidential Past
| -KAn || -mA || pronominal || bergenler (“they [apparently] gave”)
|-
!Conditional
| -sA || -mA || possessive || alsam (“if I take”)
|}

A separate set of compound tenses are formed by adding the past tense copula edi- to the derived forms listed above.

{| class="wikitable"
|-
! !! Formed With !! Negation !! Example
|-
!Habitual Past
|Future/Present || -mAz || alır edim (“I often used to take”)
|-
!Compound Past
|General Present || -A/y || ala edik (“we were taking”)
|-
!Pluperfect
|Evidential Past || -mA || alğan edim (“I had taken”)
|-
!Counterfactual Past
|Categorical Future || -mA || yazacaq edim (“I would have written”)
|-
!Progressive Past
|Progressive || -mA || Ketmekte edim. (“I kept going.”)
|-
!Past Conditional
|Conditional || -mA || alsa edim (“if I had taken”)
|}

Mood

The imperative is formed using a specific set of person markers, and negated using -mA.  In second person imperatives, only the bare verb stem is used.  A first person imperative expresses an “I/we should do X” sentiment, whereas third person expresses “let him/her do X,” as shown below with unut (“to forget”):
  
{| class="wikitable"
|-
!  || Singular || Plural
|-
!1st Person
| -(A)yIm || -(A)yIK
|-
!2nd Person
| Ø || -IñIz
|-
!3rd Person
| -sIn || -sInlAr
|}

Other moods are constructed similarly to tense/aspect forms.

{| class="wikitable"
|-
!     || Marker || Negation || Person Marker || Example
|-
!Optative
| -KAy(dI) || -mAy || pronominal || Aytqaydım (“I wish I had spoken.”)
|-
!Obligative
| -mAlY || -mA || possessive || Aytmalım (“I have to speak.”)
|}

Voice		

Grammatical voice is expressed by the addition of suffixes which come in sequence before negation, tense, aspect, mood and person markers.  There are several causative suffixes which vary depending on the ending of the verb stem.

{| class="wikitable"
|+ Voice
!     || Marker || Example
|-
! Passive
| -(I)l||aşal (“be eaten”)
|-
! Reflexive
| -(I)n||boğul (“drown oneself”)
|-
! Reciprocal
| -(I)ş||tapış (“find each other”)
|}
{| class="wikitable"
|+ Causative
! Marker || Added To || Example
|-
| -t||polysyllabic stems ending in vowel||işlet (“force to work”)
|-
| -It||stems ending in -rk, -lk, -k||qorqut (“to scare [someone]”)
|-
| -Ir||monosyllabic stems ending in -t, -ç, -ş||uçur (“allow to fly away”)
|-
| -Ar||monosyllabic stems||qopar (“break off [something]”)
|-
| -DIrm||most remaining stems||töktür (“force to spill”)
|}

Participles	
		
Past, future and present participles are formed by the addition of suffixes and are negated in the same way as other verbs.
{| class="wikitable"
|-
!     || Marker || Negation
|-
!Past
| -KAn || -mA
|-
!Future
| -cAK || -mAy
|-
!Present
| -r || -mAz
|}

Copula	
		
The copula ol (“to be, become, exist”) is generally expressed as a predicate suffix in the present tense, closely resembling the pronominal person endings, as displayed below.  The third person endings are frequently deleted in colloquial speech.  The copula’s past tense form, edi, is suppletive.  Future tense copular forms are constructed by the addition of the categorical future suffix -cAK.

 {| class="wikitable"
|-
!  || Singular || Plural
|-
!1st Person
| -(I)m||-mIz
|-
!2nd Person
| -sIñ||-sI(ñI)z
|-
!3rd Perso
| (-dır)||(-dır)
|}

VB:Verbalizing Suffix

Converbs	

Converbs, a characteristic of many Turkic languages, express sequential or dependent action.  Present tense converbs are formed by the addition of the suffixes -A (used after consonants) and -y (used after vowels).  In past tense, converbs take the suffix -Ip.  Thus:

Nouns 
Crimean Tatar noun stems take suffixes which express grammatical number, case and possession.  As in all other Turkic languages, there is no grammatical gender in Crimean Tatar.  Nouns are declined according to the following paradigm:

{| class="wikitable"
|[STEM] + [number] + [possession] + [case]   
|}

Noun derivation	
	
Noun stems are derived in a number of ways.  Most commonly, a bare noun stem can take a denominal suffix which alters its basic meaning.  Similarly, a bare verb stem can take a deverbal suffix that converts it into a noun.  There are many such denominal and deverbal suffixes in Crimean Tatar; some common suffixes are shown below:  

{| class="wikitable"
|+ Deverbal
!Marker||Meaning||Example||Gloss
|-
| -mA||result of action||aşıqma (“a hurry”)||hurry-SUF
|-
| -KI||instrument of action||bilgi (“knowledge”)||know-SUF
|-
| -KIç||utility of action||tutquç (“holder, handle”)||hold-SUF 
|-
| -I||general noun formation||ölü (“dead man”)||die-SUF
|-
| -(I)k||general noun formation||kurek (“shovel”)||scoop-SUF
|-
| -(U)v||general noun formation||quruv (“building”)||build-SUF
|}

Noun stems can also be reduplicated, which lends a more generalized meaning.  The last method of noun derivation is through the compounding of two noun stems.  Thus:

	
Number 

Nouns are pluralized by the addition of the suffix -lAr to the noun stem.  The vowel in this plural suffix agrees phonetically with the final vowel in the stem.

Use of the plural can also express respect, as in:

Possession	

Possession is expressed through person-specific suffixing.  As with the plural suffix, possession suffixes harmonize with the preceding vowel in regular ways.

{| class="wikitable"
|-
!   || Singular || Plural
|-
! 1st Person
| -(I)m || -(I)mIz
|-
! 2nd Person
| -(I)ñ || -(I)ñIz
|-
! 3rd Person
| -s(I) || -(lar)-(s)I
|}

Case

Crimean Tatar has six grammatical cases.  The nominative case is unmarked, and the remaining cases are expressed through suffixing.  These suffixes come last in a fully declined noun.
{| class="wikitable"
|-
! || Suffix || Example with bala (“child”)
|-
!Nominative
|  Ø||bala (“the child” [subject])
|-
!Accusative
| -nY||balanı (“the child” [direct object])
|-
!Genitive
| -nYñ||balanıñ (“of the child”)
|-
!Dative
| -KA||balağa (“to the child”)
|-
!Locative
| -DA||balada (“at the child”)
|-
!Ablative
| -Dan||baladan (“away from the child”)
|}

Pronouns 
Like nouns, pronouns are inflected for number, person and case but not for gender.    
{| class="wikitable" 
|-
! rowspan="2" | 
! colspan="3" | Singular
! colspan="3" | Plural
|-
! 1st || 2nd || 3rd
! 1st || 2nd || 3rd
|-
! Nominative
| men || sen || o || biz || siz || olar
|-
! Accusative
| meni || seni || onı || bizni || sizni || olarnı
|-
! Genitive
| menim || seniñ || onıñ || bizim || sizniñ || olarnıñ
|-
! Dative
| maña || saña || oña || bizge || sizge || olarǧa
|-
! Locative
| mende || sende || onda || bizde || sizde || olarda
|-
! Ablative
| menden || senden || ondan || bizden || sizden || olardan
|}

The second person plural pronoun can be used to denote formality or respect, even if its referent is a single person.

There are two roots, öz- and kendi-, that express reflexivity.  Of the two, kendi- is more common in the southern dialect, but both are used throughout the entire area in which Crimean Tatar is spoken.

Possessive pronouns are formed by adding the suffix -ki to the genitive form of a personal pronoun, as in:

{| class="wikitable"
|-
!   || Singular || Plural
|-
! 1st Person
| menimki||bizimki
|-
! 2nd Person
| seniñki||sizniñki
|-
! 3rd Person
| onıñki||olarnıñki
|}

Adjectives 
Adjectives in Crimean Tatar precede the nouns they modify.  They do not show agreement, and as such do not take any of the case, person or possession suffixes.

Adjectives can be derived by the addition of certain suffixes to a noun or verb stem.

SUF:adjectival suffix

The comparative and superlative forms of adjectives are expressed, respectively, by the suffix -ÇA and the particle eñ, as in the following examples:	

An idiomatic superlative form using episi (“all”) in the ablative case is also possible.

Postpositions 
Crimean Tatar uses postpositions.  Each postposition governs a specific case, either dative, genitive or ablative. Some common postpositions are shown below: 
{| class="wikitable"
|-
! Postposition || English || Case'
|-
|qadar||until||DAT
|-
|taba||towards||DAT
|-
|zarfında||during||GEN
|-
|ile||with||GEN
|-
|içün||for||GEN
|-
|soñ||after||ABL
|-
|sebep||due to||ABL
|}

In Dobruja 
In Dobruja Crimean Tatars use Ĭ and W, which is actually not found in Crimea. Ĭ is for [ı] sound (Tĭl "language") and W for [w] sound (Aywa "Quince"). Where in Crimea they use for [ı] and [i] the İ  letter (Til "language") for [w] and [v] the V letter (Ayva "Quince"). In dobruja they talk with  dialect which has some differences from the standard dialect. The dialect is Kipchak-Nogai which includes also Kazakh, Nogai and Karakalpak. There are very similarities with Nogai, Kazakh and Karakalpak. Sometimes they have letter changes like y → c (yaz - caz "summer"), f → p (fil → pĭl "elephant"), ç → ş (kiçkene → kĭşkene "small").

Writing systems

Crimean Tatar is written in either the Cyrillic or Latin alphabets, both modified to the specific needs of Crimean Tatar, and either used respective to where the language is used.

Historically, Arabic script was used from the sixteenth century. In the Soviet Union, it was replaced by a Latin alphabet based on Yañalif in 1928, and by a Cyrillic alphabet in 1938.

Upon Russia's annexation of Crimea in 2014, Cyrillic became the sole allowed official script because according to the Constitutional Court of Russia decision made in 2004, all languages of Russia must use Cyrillic. However there are some contradictions to the decision: virtually all Finnic languages, including distantly-related Skolt Sámi, spoken in Russia, however, currently use the Latin script as their sister languages Finnish and Estonian do, despite the historical existence of Karelian Cyrillic alphabet.

In 1992, a Latin alphabet based on Common Turkic Alphabet was adopted by the decision of the Qurultay of the Crimean Tatar People, which was formally supported by the Supreme Council of Crimea in 1997 but never implemented officially on practical level. However, in 2021, the Ministry of Reintegration of Temporarily Occupied Territories of Ukraine has announced it begins the implementation of the decision, with vice premier Oleksii Reznikov supporting the transition by stating that Latin corresponds better to Turkic phonetics. The ministry revealed it plans to finish the transition to Latin by 2025, which was supported by the Mejlis of the Crimean Tatar People. The alphabet is co-developed by A. Yu. Krymskyi Institute of Oriental Studies, Potebnia Institute of Linguistics, Institute of Philology of Taras Shevchenko National University of Kyiv and Tavrida National V.I. Vernadsky University.

Arabic alphabet
Crimean Tatars used Arabic script from 16th century to 1928.

Latin alphabet
Â â is not considered to be a separate letter. Usually it represents the  near-open front unrounded vowel, /æ/.

Cyrillic alphabet

гъ, къ, нъ and дж are separate letters (digraphs).

Legal status

The Crimean peninsula is internationally recognized as territory of Ukraine, but since the 2014 annexation by the Russian Federation is de facto administered as part of the Russian Federation.

According to Russian law, by the April 2014 constitution of the Republic of Crimea and the 2017 Crimean language law, the Crimean Tatar language is a state language in Crimea alongside Russian and Ukrainian, while Russian is the state language of the Russian Federation, the language of interethnic communication, and required in public postings in the conduct of elections and referendums.

In Ukrainian law, according to the constitution of the Autonomous Republic of Crimea, as published in Russian by its Verkhovna Rada, Russian and Crimean Tatar languages enjoy a "protected" status; every citizen is entitled, at his request, to receive government documents, such as "passport, birth certificate and others" in Crimean Tatar; but Russian is the language of interethnic communication and to be used in public life. According to the constitution of Ukraine, Ukrainian is the state language. Recognition of Russian and Crimean Tatar was a matter of political and legal debate.

Before the Sürgünlik, the 18 May 1944 deportation by the Soviet Union of Crimean Tatars to internal exile in Uzbek SSR, Crimean Tatar had an official language status in the Crimean Autonomous Soviet Socialist Republic.

Media 
The first Crimean Tatar newspaper was Terciman published in 1883-1918 by Ismail Gasprinsky. Some other Crimean Tatar media include: ATR, Qırım Aqiqat, Qırım, Meydan, Qırım Alemi, Avdet, Yañı Dünya, Yıldız.

References

Bibliography
 
Johanson, Lars (1995). “On Turkic Converb Clauses.” Converbs in Cross-Linguistic Perspective edited by Martin Haspelmath and Ekkehard König, Berlin: Mouton de Gruyter, pp. 313-347.

External links

 Linguistic corpus of Crimean Tatar language
 Crimean Tatar internet library
 Automatic Latin–Cyrillic transliterator for Crimean Tatar texts
 Crimean Tatar Online Dictionary
 Grammar about the northern dialect "Crimean Nogai"
 Crimean Tatar language names of places in Crimea

 
Agglutinative languages
Kipchak languages
Crimean Tatar culture
Languages of Ukraine
Languages of Russia
Languages of Turkey
Languages of Romania
Languages of Bulgaria
Western Kipchak
Turkic languages